{{DISPLAYTITLE:C17H17N3O2}}
The molecular formula C17H17N3O2 (molar mass: 295.336 g/mol, exact mass: 295.1321 u) may refer to:

 Divaplon (RU-32698)
 GYKI-52895

Molecular formulas